Mildred Gene Kornman (July 10, 1925 – August 19, 2022), also billed as Ricki VanDusen, was an American actress, model, businesswoman, and photographer. At the time of her death, she was one of the last living actresses of the silent era.

Life and career 
Kornman was born in Hollywood on July 10, 1925. She was the younger sister of fellow child actress Mary Kornman. Her father was Eugene Kornman, a professional still photographer who was employed by Harold Lloyd at the time of Kornman's birth. She was named after Lloyd's wife, actress Mildred Davis.

When Kornman was nine months old, she appeared with her sister Mary in The Fourth Alarm. Along with Mary, she was featured in the Our Gang short films series. Mildred was initially a regular in the series, with appearances from 1926 to 1928, and returned for a second stint from 1930 until 1935, in uncredited, non-speaking roles when many children were needed for a scene, such as a classroom.

After graduating Hollywood High School, Kornman became an actress at 20th Century Fox, albeit only in uncredited roles, under the name Ricki VanDusen. She was also a model, featuring in magazines such as Vogue and Harpers Bazaar, and in television commercials. She majored in art, English, and Spanish at the University of California, Los Angeles. Kornman married Norton Hinsey on December 30, 1943.

In 2014, Kornman attended a reunion of My Gang cast members, hosted by The Sons of the Desert as part of their 19th International Convention. In 2015, aged 89, she was living on a remote ranch in Utah. Kornman was one of the final surviving actors from the Our Gang series, which was produced from 1922 to 1944. Kornman died on August 19, 2022, at the age of 97. She was one of the longest lived Our Gang cast members ever.

Filmography

See also 
 Our Gang filmography

References

External links 
 
 

1925 births
2022 deaths
20th-century American actresses
21st-century American women
American child actresses
American film actresses
American silent film actresses
Our Gang
American people of German descent
Actresses from Hollywood, Los Angeles
University of California, Los Angeles alumni
Female models from California
Hal Roach Studios actors